Hachmei Provence refers to the rabbis of Provence, now known as Occitania, France that was a great Torah center in the times of the Tosafists. The phrase literally means the wise ones of Provence; hakham "wise one, sage" is a Sephardic and Hachmei Provençal term for a rabbi.

In matters of Halacha, as well as in their traditions and custom, the Provençal rabbis occupy an intermediate position between the Sephardic Judaism of the neighboring Spanish scholars, and the Old French (similar to the Nusach Ashkenaz) tradition represented by the Tosafists.

The term "Provence" in Jewish tradition is not limited to today's administrative region of Provence but refers to the whole of Occitania. This includes Narbonne (which is sometimes informally, though incorrectly, transliterated as "Narvona" as a result of the back-and-forth transliteration between Hebrew and Old Occitan), Lunel (which is informally transliterated Lunil), and the city of Montpellier, not far (7 km) from the Mediterranean coast. It also included cities  which at that time formed part of the Catalan political and cultural domain, such as Perpignan. In some ways, the Jewish traditions of Catalonia were closer to those of Provence than to those of the Kingdom of Castile and al-Andalus.

There was a distinctive Provençal liturgy used by the Jews of the Papal enclave of Comtat Venaissin, who remained following the expulsion of the Jews from the rest of France. This liturgy was intermediate in character between the Sephardi rites and the Nusach Ashkenaz, and was in some ways closer to the Italian rite than to either.

After the French Revolution, when Venaissin was annexed by France, the Provençal rite was replaced by the Portuguese Sephardic liturgy, which is used by the Jews of Carpentras today.

Partial list

Hachmei Narbonne

 Moses ha-Darshan
 Makhir of Narbonne and his great family.
 Moses ben Joseph ben Merwan ha-Levi
 Joseph Kimhi and sons David and Moshe.
 Abraham ben Isaac of Narbonne the Eshkol, also known as the RABaD II.
 Isaac ben Merwan ha-Levi
 Aaron ben Jacob Ha-Kohen the Orhoth Chaim, according to some he lived in Lunel.

Lunel

 Zerachiah ha-Levi of Girona the Baal haMaor.
 Abraham ben Nathan haYarhi (Yareah is Hebrew for moon, which is Lune in French, the source for the city-name Lunel).
 Yonatan HaKohen of Lunel.
 Abba Mari haYarhi, and his son Isaac.
 Rava Shlomo Yitzchaki (Rashi) (disputed)

Montpellier

 Solomon of Montpellier who led the movement against Maimonides.

Rest of Provence

 Abraham ben David known as the RABaD or RABaD III
 His son Isaac the Blind a famous Kabbalist
 Menachem Meiri
 Nathan ben Meir of Trinquetaille
 Shem-Tob ben Isaac of Tortosa
 The famous family Ibn Tibbon
 Caslari family of Carpentras
 Bonet de Lattes
 Jacob Anatoli

Members of the Kalonymus Family

 Kalonymus ben Kalonymus of Avignon.
 Kalonymus ben Todros

References
 Y. Maser (2016), Les rabbins du Sud de la France au Moyen Age et leurs écrits. Les Sages de Provincia. Institut R' Yesha'ya Bakish, Hotsaat Bakish, Montpellier, 118 p. 

 The Shem-Tov Bonet Kalonymos family

French rabbis
Rishonim
Tosafists
Provençal Jews
Judaism in France
Jewish French history